Aluminium fluoride refers to inorganic compounds with the formula AlF3·xH2O. They are all colorless solids. Anhydrous AlF3 is used in the production of aluminium metal. Several occur as minerals.

Occurrence and production
Aside from anhydrous AlF3, several hydrates are known.  With the formula AlF3·xH2O, these compounds include monohydrate (x = 1), two polymorphs of the trihydrate (x = 3), a hexahydrate (x = 6), and a nonahydrate (x = 9).

The majority of aluminium fluoride is produced by treating alumina with hydrogen fluoride at 700 °C: Hexafluorosilicic acid may also be used make aluminum fluoride.
H2SiF6 + Al2O3 + 3 H2O → 2 AlF3 + SiO2 + 4 H2O
Alternatively, it is manufactured by thermal decomposition of ammonium hexafluoroaluminate. For small scale laboratory preparations, AlF3 can also be prepared by treating aluminium hydroxide or aluminium metal with hydrogen fluoride.

Aluminium fluoride trihydrate is found in nature as the rare mineral rosenbergite.

The anhydrous form appears as the relatively recently (as of 2020) recognized mineral óskarssonite. A related, exceedingly rare mineral, is zharchikhite, Al(OH)2F.

Structure
According to X-ray crystallography, anhydrous AlF3 adopts the rhenium trioxide motif, featuring distorted AlF6 octahedra.  Each fluoride is connected to two Al centers.  Because of its three-dimensional polymeric structure, AlF3 has a high melting point. The other trihalides of aluminium in the solid state differ, AlCl3 has a layer structure and AlBr3 and AlI3, are molecular dimers. Also they have low melting points and evaporate readily to give dimers.  In the gas phase aluminium fluoride exists as trigonal molecules of D3h symmetry. The Al–F bond lengths of this gaseous molecule are 163 pm.

Applications
Aluminium fluoride is an important additive for the production of aluminium by electrolysis. Together with cryolite, it lowers the melting point to below 1000 °C and increases the conductivity of the solution. It is into this molten salt that aluminium oxide is dissolved and then electrolyzed to give bulk Al metal.

Aluminum fluoride complexes are used to study the mechanistic aspects of phosphoryl transfer reactions in biology, which are of fundamental importance to cells, as phosphoric acid anhydrides such as adenosine triphosphate and guanosine triphosphate control most of the reactions involved in metabolism, growth and differentiation. The observation that aluminum fluoride can bind to and activate heterotrimeric G proteins has proven to be useful for the study of G protein activation in vivo, for the elucidation of three-dimensional structures of several GTPases, and for understanding the biochemical mechanism of GTP hydrolysis, including the role of GTPase-activating proteins.

Niche uses
Together with zirconium fluoride, aluminium fluoride is an ingredient for the production of fluoroaluminate glasses.

It is also used to inhibit fermentation.

Like magnesium fluoride it is used as a low-index optical thin film, particularly when far UV transparency is required. Its deposition by physical vapor deposition, particularly by evaporation, is favorable.

Safety
The reported oral animal lethal dose (LD50) of aluminum fluoride is 100 mg/kg. Repeated or prolonged inhalation exposure may cause asthma, and may have effects on the bone and nervous system, resulting in bone alterations (fluorosis), and nervous system impairment.

Many of the neurotoxic effects of fluoride are due to the formation of aluminum fluoride complexes, which mimic the chemical structure of a phosphate and influence the activity of ATP phosphohydrolases and phospholipase D. Only micromolar concentrations of aluminum are needed to form aluminum fluoride.

Human exposure to aluminum fluoride can occur in an industrial setting, such as emissions from aluminum reduction processes, or when a person ingests both a fluoride source (e.g., fluoride in drinking water or residue of fluoride-based pesticides) and an aluminum source; sources of human exposure to aluminum include drinking water, tea, food residues, infant formula, aluminum-containing antacids or medications, deodorants, cosmetics, and glassware. Fluoridation chemicals may also contain aluminum fluoride. Data on the potential neurotoxic effects of chronic exposure to the aluminum species existing in water are limited.

See also
 Aluminium monofluoride

References

External links

 MSDS
 ToxNet Profile
 PubChem

Aluminium compounds
Fluorides
Metal halides